Ḥabīb ibn Aws al-Ṭā’ī (ca. 796/807 - 845), better known by his sobriquet Abū Tammām, was an Arab poet and Muslim convert born to Christian parents. He is best known in literature by his 9th-century compilation of early poems known as the Hamasah, considered one of the greatest anthologies of Arabic literature ever assembled. Hamasah contained 10 books of poems, with 884 poems in total.

Biography 

Abu Tammam was born in Syria near Damascus in a small town called Jasim (in modern-day Syria), north-east of the Sea of Tiberias and close to Daraa. He was the son of a Christian named Thādhūs (Taddeo or Theodosius) who sold wine in Damascus. His early life is not well known. It is believed that Abu Tammam himself converted to Islam, changing his father's name to Aws and forged a genealogy linking him to the Arab tribe of T̩ayy. According to al-Najashi, Abu Tammam was a Twelver Shia Muslim as evident by some of his poems. He was also a contemporary of the Imams Ali al-Rida and his son Muhammad al-Jawad, whom he mentioned in some of his poems.

He seems to have spent his youth in Homs, though, according to one story, he was employed during his boyhood selling water at a mosque in Cairo. His first appearance as a poet was in Egypt, but as he failed to make a living there he went to Damascus, and then to Mosul. From there he sought patronage from the Syria-based caliph al-Ma'mun of the Abbasid Caliphate, but failed to impress him.

He then traveled towards the eastern part of the caliphate, eventually gaining admirers and patrons by praising various officials, such as the governor of Arminiya Khalid ibn Yazid al-Shaybani who reportedly gave him 10,000 dirhams on each occasion and financed his travels. Following the death of al-Ma'mun, the newly famous Abu Tamman sought an audience with the new caliph al-Mu'tasim who immediately took him under his wing. After 833 he lived mostly in Baghdad, at the court of the caliph. From Baghdad he visited Khorasan, where he enjoyed the favour of Abdullah ibn Tahir. In approximately 845 he was in Ma'arrat al-Nu'man, where he met the poet al-Buhturi (c. 820–897). He died in Mosul in 845.

Abu Tammam is best known in literature by his 9th-century compilation of early poems known as the Hamasah. The Hamasah ("exhortation") is one of the greatest anthologies of Arabic literature ever assembled. Abu Tammam gathered these works together when he was snowbound in Hamadan, where he had access to an excellent library belonging to Abu al-Wafa ibn Salama. There are ten books of poems in the Hamasah, all classified by subject. Some of them are selections from long poems. This is one of the treasuries of early Arabic poetry, and the poems are of exceptional beauty. A later anthology by the same name was compiled by the poet al-Buhturi, and the term has been used in modern times to mean "heroic epic."

The famous poet al-Buhturi, who was a student and contemporary of Abu Tammâm, was also a member of the Tay' tribe. In Arabic literature, these two poets have often been compared with each other. Generally, Abu Tammâm is accepted as the representative of the artificial (masnû') poetry style. On the other hand, his student al-Buhturî is generally regarded as the representative of the natural (matbû‘) poetry genre.

Two other collections of a similar nature are ascribed to Abu Tammam. His own poems have been somewhat neglected owing to the success of his compilations, but they enjoyed great repute in his lifetime. His poems reflect a stylistic break from prevailing oral-based concepts of Arab poetry, often describing historical events and people. They were distinguished for the purity of their style, the merit of the verse, and the excellent manner of treating subjects, and have been linked to the prevailing Mutazilite philosophy of the Abbasid period. His poems were published in Cairo in 1875.

According to the poet Adunis, Abu Tammam "started out from a vision of poetry as a sort of creation of the world through language, comparing the relationship between the poet and the word to the relationship between two lovers, and the act of composing poetry to the sexual act."

References 

850 deaths
9th-century Arabic poets
Converts to Islam from Christianity
Poets from the Abbasid Caliphate
Shia Muslims
People from Daraa Governorate
9th-century people from the Abbasid Caliphate